Jabala Sharqiya  is a Syrian village located in Hish Nahiyah in Maarrat al-Nu'man District, Idlib. According to the Syria Central Bureau of Statistics (CBS), Jabala Sharqiya had a population of 332 in the 2004 census.

References 

Populated places in Maarat al-Numan District